Emil Blomberg (born 9 April 1992) is a Swedish runner specialising in the 3000 metres steeplechase. He represented his country at the 2017 World Championships without finishing his heat.

International competitions

1Did not finish in the final

Personal bests

Outdoor
800 metres – 1:53.66 (Sollentuna 2016)
1500 metres – 3:47.64 (Kristiansand 2016)
3000 metres – 8:45.19 (Austin 2012)
5000 metres – 14:30.76 (Arlington 2017)
3000 metres steeplechase – 8:20.55 (Ordegem 2021)

Indoor
800 metres – 1:51.04 (Birmingham 2015)
1500 metres – 4:05.26 (Sätra 2011)
One mile – 4:07.33 (Lincoln 2015)
3000 metres – 8:12.31 (Birmingham 2014)
5000 metres – 14:45.80 (Birmingham 2014)

References

1992 births
Living people
Swedish male steeplechase runners
World Athletics Championships athletes for Sweden
People from Järfälla Municipality
Athletes (track and field) at the 2020 Summer Olympics
Olympic athletes of Sweden
Sportspeople from Stockholm County
21st-century Swedish people